Stenoptilodes sordipennis is a moth of the family Pterophoridae that is known from Colombia.

External links

sordipennis
Moths described in 1877
Endemic fauna of Colombia
Moths of South America